Justice Wallace may refer to:

James P. Wallace (1928–2017), associate justice of the Texas Supreme Court
John E. Wallace Jr. (born 1942), associate justice of the New Jersey Supreme Court
William T. Wallace (1828–1909), chief justice of the Supreme Court of California

See also
Judge Wallace (disambiguation)